Focșani is the capital city of Vrancea County in Romania on the banks the river Milcov, in the historical region of Moldavia. It has a population of 66,719.

Geography
Focșani lies at the foot of the Curvature Carpathians, at a point of convergence for tectonic geologic faults, which raises the risk of earthquakes in the vicinity. Though Vrancea County is one of the most popular wine-producing regions in Romania, Odobești being just to the northwest, in Romania, Focșani itself is not considered a wine-producing center. The wine sold as Weisse von Fokshan in Germany and some other European countries is generally a Fetească Albă de Odobești wine, and practically a second-rated wine which does not comply to the European Union rules of naming the regions of origin of wines.

The vicinity is rich in minerals such as iron, copper, coal, and petroleum.

The city administers two villages, Mândrești-Moldova and Mândrești-Munteni.

Focșani lies within the strategically important Focșani Gate. In the 19th century, the Focșani–Nămoloasa–Galați line was built to defend this area more properly.

Seismic hazard
The territory of Vrancea County corresponds to the most seismically active zone of Romania.

The earthquakes with the epicenter in Vrancea are caused by the movements of the nearby fault blocks. Devastating earthquakes measuring 7 to 8 on the Richter scale have been recorded in 1738, 1802, 1838, 1940, 1977 and 1986.

History

As a town on the Moldavian-Wallachian border, Focșani developed into an important trade center halfway between the Russian Empire and the Balkans. A congress between Imperial Russian and Ottoman diplomats took place near the city in 1772. Near the town, the Ottomans suffered a severe defeat at the hands of the allied forces of the Habsburg monarchy under Prince Frederick Josias of Saxe-Coburg-Saalfeld and Imperial Russia under Alexander Suvorov in 1789 (see Battle of Focșani).

In the 1850s (after the Crimean War), Focșani grew in importance as the center of activities in favor of the union between Wallachia and Moldavia (the Danubian Principalities), leading up to the double election of Alexandru Ioan Cuza in Iași and Bucharest in 1859. From 1858, it housed a Central Commission regulating the common legislation of the two countries, as well as the High Court of Justice. Both institutions were disestablished in 1864, when the Romanian Principality was founded as a unified state. Focșani's role in the forming of the modern Romanian state is immortalized in the Union Square Obelisk.

On 30–31 December 1881, following the impact of Zionism on the Romanian Jewish community, the First Congress of all Zionist Unions in Romania for the promotion of the return to Eretz Israel was held at Focșani. It was attended by 51 delegates, representing 32 organizations, two press editors, three newspaper reporters and important guests. This 1881 Congress, the first ever held, 16 years before the World Zionist Organization's First Zionist (held in Basel), had a major influence on the Romanian Jews, and its proceedings also became known outside the borders of Romania.

In 1917, during the Romanian Campaign of World War I, Focșani and Galați were part of a line of fortifications known as the Siret Line. The Armistice of Focșani was signed in the city on 9 December 1917, between the Kingdom of Romania and the Central Powers.

In 1944, during World War II, Focșani was supposed to be part of the fortified Focșani–Nămoloasa–Galați line, where 9 elite divisions were preparing to resist the Soviet Red Army's advance after the Battle of Târgu Frumos. However, due to the coup d'état on 23 August 1944 (see Romania during World War II), this never materialized.

Demographics

As of 2011 census data, Focșani has a population of 73,868, a decrease from the figure recorded at the 2002 census, making it the 27th largest city in Romania.

According to the census from 2002, there were 101,854 people living within the city of Focșani. The ethnic makeup was as follows:

 Romanians: 98.68%
 Roma: 1.07%
 Hungarians: 0.05%
 Other: 0.2%

Coat of arms

Focșani's location on the Milcov (the river that divided Wallachia and Moldavia) inspired the design of its coat of arms, which depicts the handshake of two women personifying both principalities as a symbol of the union, with the motto "Unirea face puterea" ("Unity makes strength").

Natives
 Valentina Ardean-Elisei
 Camil Baltazar 
 Constantin C. Giurescu
 Simona Gogîrlă
 Carl Grünberg
 Leon Kalustian
 Ion Mincu
 Cilibi Moise
 Alin Moldoveanu
 Ion Nestor
 Anghel Saligny
 
 Solomon Schechter
 George Simion
 Gheorghe Tattarescu

International relations

Focșani is twinned with:
 Majdanpek, Serbia
 Tivoli, Italy

References

External links

 
Cities in Romania
Capitals of Romanian counties
Populated places in Vrancea County
Localities in Western Moldavia
Shtetls